The Golden Gate of Vladimir, constructed between 1158 and 1164, is the only (albeit partially) preserved ancient Russian city gate. A museum inside focuses on the history of the Mongol invasion of Russia in the 13th century.

Golden Gates existed in the holiest cities of Eastern Orthodoxy: Jerusalem, Constantinople, and Kiev. On making Vladimir his capital, Andrew the Pious aspired to emulate these structures, commissioning a lofty tower over the city's main gate to be erected in limestone and lined with golden plaques. According to ancient Russian chronicles, the masons were invited from Friedrich Barbarossa. The main arch used to stand 15 meters tall. The structure was topped with a barbican church dedicated to the Deposition of the Virgin's Robe and symbolizing the Theotokos's protection of Andrew's capital.

The gate survived the Mongol destruction of Vladimir in 1237. By the late 18th century, however, the structure had so deteriorated that Catherine the Great was afraid to pass through the arch for fear of its tumbling down. In 1779, she ordered detailed measurements and drawings of the monument to be executed. In 1795, after many discussions, the vaults and barbican church were demolished. Two flanking round towers were constructed in order to reinforce the structure, and artisans then reconstructed the barbican, following the drawings made in 1779.

The site became a UNESCO World Heritage site in 1992.

References

External links 
 Tourism portal of the Vladimir region, Russia
 

Buildings and structures completed in the 12th century
Infrastructure completed in 1795
White Monuments of Vladimir and Suzdal
Towers in Russia
Gates in Russia
Buildings and structures in Vladimir, Russia
Vladimir-Suzdal Museum Reserve
Cultural heritage monuments of federal significance in Vladimir Oblast